Beauveria bassiana is a fungus that grows naturally in soils throughout the world and acts as a parasite on various arthropod species, causing white muscardine disease; it thus belongs to the entomopathogenic fungi. It is used as a biological insecticide to control a number of pests, including termites, thrips, whiteflies, aphids and various beetles. Its use in the control of bedbugs and malaria-transmitting mosquitos is under investigation.

Discovery and name
The species is named after the Italian entomologist Agostino Bassi, who discovered it in 1835 as the cause of the muscardine disease which then led to carriers transmitting it by airborne means, and later the same year it was named Botrytis bassiana by Giuseppe Gabriel Balsamo-Crivelli. In 1911 Jean Beauverie did further study and the next year Jean Paul Vuillemin made it the type species of his new Beauveria. It was formerly also known as Tritirachium shiotae.  The name B. bassiana has long been used to describe a species complex of morphologically similar and closely related isolates. Rehner and Buckley have shown that B. bassiana consists of many distinct lineages that should be recognized as distinct phylogenetic species and the genus Beauveria was redescribed with a proposed type for B. bassiana in 2011.  In light of this work and the known existence of cryptic species, it is important to characterise isolates used to develop biological insecticides.

Relation to Cordyceps and other fungi
Beauveria bassiana is the anamorph (asexually reproducing form) of Cordyceps bassiana. The latter teleomorph (the sexually reproducing form) has been collected only in eastern Asia.

White muscardine disease
The insect disease caused by the fungus is a muscardine which has been called white muscardine disease. When the microscopic spores of the fungus come into contact with the body of an insect host, they germinate, penetrate the cuticle, and grow inside, killing the insect within a matter of days. Afterwards, a white mold emerges from the cadaver and produces new spores. A typical isolate of B. bassiana can attack a broad range of insects; various isolates differ in their host range. The factors responsible for host susceptibility are not known.

Beauveria bassiana parasitizing the Colorado potato beetle has been reported to be, in turn, the host of a mycoparasitic fungus Syspastospora parasitica. This organism also attacks related insect-pathogenic species of the Clavicipitaceae.

Morphology of the fungus
In culture, B. bassiana grows as a white mould. On most common cultural media, it produces many dry, powdery conidia in distinctive white spore balls. Each spore ball is composed of a cluster of conidiogenous cells.  The conidiogenous cells of B. bassiana are short and ovoid, and terminate in a narrow apical extension called a rachis.  The rachis elongates after each conidium is produced, resulting in a long zig-zag extension. The conidia are single-celled, haploid, and hydrophobic.

Use in biological control of insects
Beauveria bassiana can be used as a biological insecticide to control a number of pests such as termites, whiteflies, and many other insects. Its use in the control of malaria-transmitting mosquitos is under investigation. As an insecticide, the spores are sprayed on affected crops as an emulsified suspension or wettable powder or applied to mosquito nets as a mosquito control agent.

As a species, Beauveria bassiana parasitizes a very wide range of arthropod hosts. However, different strains vary in their host ranges, some having rather narrow ranges, like strain Bba 5653 that is very virulent to the larvae of the diamondback moth and kills only few other types of caterpillars. Some strains do have a wide host range and should, therefore, be considered nonselective biological insecticides. These should not be applied to flowers visited by pollinating insects.

Known targets include:
 Aphids
 Whiteflies
 Mealybugs
 Psyllids
 Chinch bug
 Lygus bugs
 Grasshoppers
 Stink bugs (Halyomorpha halys)
 Thrips
 Termites
 Fire ants
 Flies
 Stem borers
 Fungal gnats
 Shoreflies
 Beetles
 Bark beetle
 Black vine weevil
 Boll weevil
 Cereal leaf beetle
 Coffee berry borer
 Colorado potato beetle
 Emerald ash borer (in conjunction with the parasitoid wasp Tetrastichus planipennisi)
 Japanese beetle
 Mexican bean beetle
 Red palm weevil
 Strawberry root weevil
 Caterpillars
 Codling moth
 Douglas fir tussock moth
 European corn borer
 Invasive silkworms
 Apple clearwing moth
 Mites

The fungus rarely infects humans or other animals, so it is generally considered safe as an insecticide. However, at least one case of human infection by B. bassiana has been reported in a person with a suppressed immune system. Additionally, the spores may exacerbate breathing difficulties. Wagner and Lewis reported the ability of B. bassiana to grow as an endophyte in corn.

A fungus attributed to be B. bassiana was observed to cause infections in a captive American alligator and B. bassiana was implicated in causing a pulmonary disease in captive tortoises. The reptiles were in captivity and under temperature stress which may explain their susceptibility to the fungus. When a tortoise was kept at 22°C and injected with 0.5 mL of 106 spores of B. bassiana into the lung, no mortality was observed, while a second contaminated tortoise died when kept only at 16°C.

Preliminary research has shown the fungus is 100% effective in eliminating bed bugs exposed to cotton fabric sprayed with fungus spores. It is also effective against bed bug colonies due to B. bassiana carried by infected bugs back to their harborages. The tested strain of B bassiana caused rapid mortality (3 – 5 days) after short-term exposure.  In a 2017 follow-up study, pyrethroid-resistant bed bugs had >94% mortality after treatment with a commercial preparation of B. bassiana.

A microevolutionary experiment in 2013 showed that the Greater wax moth (Galleria mellonella) was able to adapt its defense mechanisms during 25 generations, while being under constant selective pressure from the fungus B. bassiana. The moth developed resistance, but apparently, at a cost.

Containment leak
In March 2013, genetically modified Beauveria bassiana was found in a number of research laboratories and greenhouses outside of a designated containment area at Lincoln University in Christchurch, New Zealand. The Ministry for Primary Industries investigated the leak.

See also

 Biological insecticides
 Metarhizium spp. which cause "green muscardine" disease

References

Further reading
 
 

Biopesticides
Clavicipitaceae
Fungi described in 1836
Malaria
Parasitic fungi